The Famous Five is a series of novels by Enid Blyton

The Famous Five may also refer to:

Adaptations of the novel series:
Famous Five (film), a 2012 German adaptation
The Famous Five (1978 TV series), a TV adaptation
The Famous Five (1995 TV series), another TV adaptation
Famous 5: On the Case, an animated series

Other uses:
The Famous Five (Canada), a group of Canadian women who were proponents in a landmark women's rights case
The Famous Five (football), a Hibernian Football Club forward line during the late 1940s and early 1950s
Famous Five (Greyfriars School), schoolfellows of Billy Bunter
Spiro (band) or The Famous Five, a music group based in Bristol, England

See also
Fab Five (disambiguation)